Sašo Štalekar (born 3 May 1996) is a Slovenian male volleyball player. He is part of the Slovenian national team and plays the position of middle blocker. At club level, he plays for Berlin Recycling Volleys.

Sporting achievements

National team
 2019  Men's European Volleyball Championship
 2021  Men's European Volleyball Championship

References

External links
FIVB 2016 Stats
Player Details
FIVB 2015 Profile
World Of Volley profile

1996 births
Living people
Sportspeople from Slovenj Gradec
Slovenian men's volleyball players
Slovenian expatriate sportspeople in Austria
Expatriate volleyball players in Austria
Slovenian expatriate sportspeople in Germany
Expatriate volleyball players in Germany
Slovenian expatriate sportspeople in Greece
Expatriate volleyball players in Greece
Panathinaikos V.C. players